Shirak State University Futsal Club, shortly known as Sh.S.U. Futsal, is an Armenian professional futsal club based in Gyumri, representing the Shirak State University named after Mikael Nalbandian.

History
Shirak State University Futsal Club was formed in 2017 by the initiation of the Shirak University rector Dr. Sahak Minasyan, and through the efforts of the university students, alumni and a group of professional futsal players from Shirak Province. The team currently plays at the Armenian Futsal Premier League, using the Aram Sargsyan Sports Hall of Gyumri as their home ground. During their inaugural 2017-18 season, the team occupied the 8th position among 8 teams.

Season by season

References

Sh.S.U.
Sport in Gyumri
2017 establishments in Armenia
Futsal clubs established in 2017